Mickey Jones (June 10, 1941 – February 7, 2018) was an American musician and actor.  He played drums with acts such as Trini Lopez and Bob Dylan, with whom he played on his 1966 world tour.  He became a founding member of The First Edition with singer Kenny Rogers, and played on all of their albums.  Overall, Jones played on 17 gold records from his musical career of over two decades.

After the break-up of The First Edition in 1976, Jones concentrated on his career as a character actor, where he made many appearances in film and television.

Early life and career

Mickey Jones was born on June 10, 1941, in Houston, Texas, to Fred Edward Jones, a U.S. Navy officer, and Frances Marie (née Vieregge) Jones, a homemaker. His sister, Cheryl Marie, died in 2006.

Jones attended Sunset High School in the Oak Cliff neighborhood of Dallas. It was during this time that he obtained and learned to play his first set of drums. After sitting in with several local bands, Jones and four schoolmates formed their own band, called The Catalinas. Although the band saw some local success, he was replaced by a new drummer, as Jones was only sixteen at the time, and the band wanted someone who was of legal age.

Sideman drumming

After working as a freelance drummer with various acts, Jones was introduced to Trini Lopez. When Lopez's drummer became ill, he was asked to take his place and eventually became the band's new permanent drummer.

In 1959, Jones left Lopez's band to pursue a degree in business administration at North Texas State College (now University of North Texas). After college, he took a job at Rohr Aircraft in San Diego. Seeing that the life of a factory worker was not for him, Jones moved to Los Angeles to get back into the entertainment industry. He landed a job as a page at the NBC studios, while re-establishing his friendship with Lopez, who had moved to Los Angeles as well. Jones would again become Lopez's drummer, while Lopez would see much success with hits such as "If I Had A Hammer", "La Bamba" and "America".

In 1966, Jones was made an offer by Bob Dylan to join him as his back-up drummer. Replacing Levon Helm, who had quit, Jones would accompany Dylan with the other members of what would become The Band, on his world tour of Australia and Europe. It was during this tour while performing at the Free Trade Hall in Manchester, England, on May 17, 1966, that the audience jeered Dylan for playing the electric guitar during the latter half of the show.
Jones' career with Dylan would be cut short when Dylan had to temporarily stop performing in order to recover from a motorcycle accident.

At this time, Jones had decided to pursue a career in acting. He had landed jobs as an extra, when in 1967 he was approached to be the drummer for a new group called The First Edition, with lead singer Kenny Rogers.

With hits such as "Something's Burning", "Ruby, Don't Take Your Love to Town" and "Just Dropped In (To See What Condition My Condition Was In)", The First Edition would see much success over the next ten years, even having their own television variety show, Rollin' on the River (later shortened to Rollin), in the early 1970s.

Acting career
After the breakup of The First Edition in 1976, Jones pursued a full-time career in acting. As a character actor, he would make many appearances on television and film, such as being part of the cast of Flo, the short-lived spin-off to the CBS sitcom Alice, his role as a crooked mechanic/sheriff in National Lampoon's Vacation and his role as Chris Farber, the buddy of Ham Tyler (Michael Ironside) in the miniseries and weekly television series, V.

Later, Jones would have a cameo in Ironside's film Total Recall (1990). Jones had no scenes with Ironside – he played a Martian miner on a train with Doug Quaid (Arnold Schwarzenegger).

In 1992, he played a small but memorable role in the television show Northern Exposure episode "Heroes" as Chris Stevens’ (John Corbett) deceased mentor, Tooley O'Toole, who is delivered to Chris in a wooden box.

He appeared as the subway riding biker in a Breath Savers commercial and had a recurring role as Pete Bilker on the ABC sitcom Home Improvement. In 1996, he appeared in Sling Blade as the drummer in the band (a prominent speaking part in the band scenes), and Tin Cup, with fellow character actor Dennis Burkley. He and Burkley were commonly mistaken for each other.

In 2005, he contributed to the documentary, No Direction Home: Bob Dylan. From 2011 to 2014, he had a recurring role on the television show Justified, as Rodney "Hot Rod" Dunham, a marijuana distributor who ran a small band of criminals.

Author
In 2007, Jones published his autobiography That Would Be Me, the title based on the catchphrase often used by his character on Home Improvement.

Death
Jones died from complications of diabetes on February 7, 2018, aged 76. He is survived by his wife, Phyllis Jean Starr, and their two children, and three step children.

Partial filmography

Films

 Wild in the Streets (1968)
 Tom Horn (1980) – Brown's Hole Rustler
 Stir Crazy (1980) – Guard #8
 Stand By Your Man (1981, TV Movie) – Eddie
 Making Love (1982) – Cowboy Musician
 Wrong Is Right (1982) – Gunman
 The Best Little Whorehouse in Texas (1982) – Henry
 Living Proof: The Hank Williams Jr. Story (1983, TV Movie) – Mickey
 China Lake (1983, Short) – Big Guy
 National Lampoon's Vacation (1983) – Mechanic
 Starman (1984) – Trucker
 Savage Dawn (1985) – Savage Zero
 Hunter's Blood (1986) – Wash Pot
 Welcome to 18 (1986) – Harper
 Extreme Prejudice (1987) – Chub Luke
 Nadine (1987) – Floyd
 Talking Walls (1987)
 The Couch Trip (1988) – Watkins
 It Takes Two (1988) – Bucholtz
 Dead Bang (1989) – Sleepy
 Homer & Eddie (1989) – Man at Pizza Joint
 Total Recall (1990) – Burly Miner
 Dutch (1991) – Truck Driver
 Pyrates (1991) – Wisconsin Del
 Out on a Limb (1992) – Virgil
 Black Ice (1992) – Lloyd Carter
 Night Trap (1993) – Bartender
 The Beverly Hillbillies (1993) – Spittin' Sam
 Forced to Kill (1994) – Neil
 Drop Zone (1994) – Deuce
 Sunchaser (1996) – Fuzzy, Biker #1
 Tin Cup (1996) – Turk
 Sling Blade (1996) – Monty Johnson
 The Fanatics (1997) – Rex Tweedy
 Ringmaster (1998) – Man on Show (uncredited)
 The Last Best Sunday (1999) – Bartender
 Grizzly Adams and the Legend of Dark Mountain (1999) – Sergeant Evans
 Vice (2000) – Officer Duke
 The Last Real Cowboys (2000, Short) – Slope
 The View from the Swing (2000) – Mountain Man
 Never Look Back (2000)
 Shattered Lies (2002) – Kenny Kingman
 Shattered Lies (2002) – William Holt
 The Fighting Temptations (2003) – Scooter
 True Legends of the West (2003) – Two Gun Sly Willy
 Bob Dylan - World Tour 1966: The Home Movies (2003) – Himself – The Band
 Iowa (2005) – Darrell McNeely
 No Direction Home: Bob Dylan (2005)
 Collier & Co. (2006)
 Penny Dreadful (2006) – Eddie
 Country Remedy (2006)
 Simple Things (2007) – Stan Slyder
 Corners (2007)
 High Desert (2007)
 Necrosis (2009) – Hank
 Downstream (2010) – Meat Vendor
 Thriftstore Cowboy (2012) – Billy Henley
 Rebel On The Highway (2018) – Uncle Mickey (final film role)

Television

 Rollin' on the River (1971) – First Edition Drummer
 The Dream Makers (1975, TV Movie) – Jesse
 The Rockford Files (1977) – Chubby Pool Player
 The Incredible Hulk (1978–1981) – George / Doc / Ricky Detter
 Charlie’s Angels (1979) – Bo Mackey
 The Dukes of Hazzard (1979) – B.B. Davenport
 Galactica 1980 (1980) – (Pilot Episode: Donzo)
 CHiPs (1980) Satin's Angels (Big Daddy)
 Flo (1980–1981) – Chester
 M*A*S*H (1981) – M.P. #2
 Hear No Evil – (1982 made-for-TV-movie) Blackman
 V: The Series (1984–1985) – Chris Farber
 V: The Final Battle (1984) – Chris Farber
 Misfits of Science (1985) – Arnold Biefneiter
 ALF (1986) – Artie
 In The Heat of the Night "Country Mouse, City Mouse" (as Willie Baylor) (1989) – Willie Baylor
 21 Jump Street (1989) – Bobo
 Baywatch (1990–1992) – Lonny / Red
 Home Improvement (1991–1999) – Pete Bilker
 Get a Life (1991) – Ray
 Northern Exposure "Heroes" (as Chris' deceased mentor, Tooley) (1992–1994) – Toolie / Tooley
 Step by Step (1993) – Virgil
 Saved by the Bell: Wedding in Las Vegas (1994) – Ray
 Married... with Children (1996) – Parley Wayne Rockefeller
 Boy Meets World (1996–1999) – Ezekial / Milkshake Guy
 Beyond Belief: Fact or Fiction (1997)
 Lizzie McGuire (2002) – Sonny Reid
 Entourage (2007) – Mickey Jones
 Justified (2011–2014) – Rodney 'Hot Rod' Dunham
 Workaholics (2012) – Arthur
 It's Always Sunny in Philadelphia (2013) – Gunther
 Growing Up Fisher (2014) – Ronnie
 Newsreaders (2015) – Kelson Habson

Music videos
 "Sunset Blvd" (2005)

References

External links
 
 
 
 

1941 births
2018 deaths
American male film actors
American rock drummers
American male television actors
Burials at Forest Lawn Memorial Park (Hollywood Hills)
Musicians from Houston
Kenny Rogers and The First Edition members
Musicians from Texas
Writers from Houston
Male actors from Texas
20th-century American drummers
American male drummers
University of North Texas alumni
20th-century American male musicians